Leini (formerly Leinì), is a comune (municipality) in the Metropolitan City of Turin in the Italian region Piedmont, located about  north of Turin.

Twin towns
 Bangolo, Côte d'Ivoire, since 2004

References

External links
 Official website

Cities and towns in Piedmont
Canavese